Qutb al-Din Shah Jahan was the last Qutlughkhanid ruler of Kerman.

Life 
He was a son of Suyurghatmish. His reign was brief after his succession to his cousin. He was reported to be cruel, corrupt and extremely tempered. He was replaced by a Mongol governor Malik Nasiraddin Mohammad on the orders of Öljeitu. He lived the rest of his life in Shiraz with her step-mother Kurdujin Khatun. Her daughter Qutlughkhan Makdumshah was married to Mubariz al-Din Muhammad in 1328, who became the founder of Muzaffarid dynasty.

References 

14th-century Khitan rulers
Qutlugh-Khanids